The Hungary national badminton team represents Hungary in international badminton team competitions. It is controlled by the Hungarian Badminton Association. The Hungarian team have only participated in the Sudirman Cup three times.

The women's team reached the quarterfinals of the 2020 European Women's Team Badminton Championships. The mixed team have also competed in the Helvetia Cup.

Participation in BWF competitions

Sudirman Cup

Participation in European Team Badminton Championships

Men's Team

Women's Team

Mixed Team

Participation in Helvetia Cup 
The Helvetia Cup or European B Team Championships was a European mixed team championship in badminton. The first Helvetia Cup tournament took place in Zurich, Switzerland in 1962. The tournament took place every two years from 1971 until 2007, after which it was dissolved. Hungary hosted the 1989 Helvetia Cup.

Participation in European Junior Team Badminton Championships
Mixed Team

Current squad 
The following players were selected to represent Hungary at the 2020 European Men's and Women's Team Badminton Championships.

Male players
Gergely Krausz
Gergo Pytel
Andras Piliszky
Balasz Papai
Mate Balint
Bene Benjamin Kiss
Balint Papai
Marton Szerecz
Gergely Szita

Female players
Laura Sárosi
Réka Madarász
Vivien Sándorházi
Mónika Szőke
Daniella Gonda
Ágnes Kőrösi
Fanni Dóra Kiss

References

Badminton
National badminton teams
Badminton in Hungary